Red Lake may refer to:

Lakes

Australia
Red Lake (Western Australia)

Croatia
Red Lake (Croatia) (Crveno jezero)

Romania
Red Lake (Romania) (Lacul Roşu)

United States

Red Lake (Arizona–New Mexico)
Red Lake (Orlando), Florida
Red Lake (Minnesota), the largest lake entirely within the state
Red Lake (New York)
Red Lake (Douglas County, Wisconsin)

Other places

Canada
Red Lake, Ontario

United States
Red Lake, Arizona, a census-designated place
Red Lake Peak, a summit of the Sierra Nevada mountains in California
Red Lake, Minnesota, a census-designated place
Red Lake County, Minnesota
Red Lake Indian Reservation, Minnesota
Red Lake Senior High School, Minnesota
Red Lake shootings, a series of shootings in 2005
Red Lake River in Minnesota
Lower Red Lake, Minnesota, an unorganized territory
Upper Red Lake, Minnesota, an unorganized territory
Red Lake Township, Logan County, North Dakota

See also
Lake Chervonoye, in Belarus
Raudvatnet, in Norway
Rotsee, in Switzerland
Red Lake Falls (disambiguation)